Interatrial foramen may refer to:

 Primary interatrial foramen
 Foramen secundum